David Michael Bowman (born 16 December 1960 in Scarborough, England) is an English former footballer.

He played for Bridlington Town and Scarborough.

Notes

1960 births
Living people
Sportspeople from Scarborough, North Yorkshire
English footballers
Association football forwards
Bridlington Town A.F.C. players
Scarborough F.C. players
English Football League players
National League (English football) players
Footballers from North Yorkshire